o-Cresyl glycidyl ether (ortho-cresyl glycidyl ether, o-CGE) is a liquid aromatic organic chemical compound and chemically a glycidyl ether. It has the formula C10H12O2 and the CAS Registry Number 2210-79-9.  It is one of a number of glycidyl ethers available commercially that are used to reduce the viscosity of epoxy resins. These are then further used in coatings, sealants, adhesives and elastomers.

Uses
The main use of o-CGE is to reduce the viscosity of epoxy resins. These reduced viscosity resins may then be used to formulate coatings including UV cured versions. It is a monofunctional diluent and so in polymer science terms is a chain terminator. Chain extenders (f = 2) and cross linkers (f ≥ 3) are low molecular weight di or tri-functional epoxy diluents. The use of the diluent does effect mechanical properties and microstructure of epoxy resins. As it has glycidyl functionality, it is classed as a Reactive diluent.

Other names
o-CGE is known by a number of other names. These include: 
 Oxirane, 2-[(2-methylphenoxy)methyl]-
 Propane, 1,2-epoxy-3-(o-tolyloxy)-
 Oxirane, [(2-methylphenoxy)methyl]-
 2-[(2-Methylphenoxy)methyl]oxirane
 1-(o-Methylphenoxy)-2,3-epoxypropane

Toxicology
The material is a skin irritant and skin sensitizer. The toxicology has been reasonably well studied. It is REACH registered and produced or imported into the European Union in quantities greater than one thousand tonnes per annum.

See also
 Epoxide
 Glycidol

References

Further reading

External Websites
  Hexion HELOXY™ 62 | Miller-Stephenson
 RoyOxy® RAD 100 O-cresyl Glycidyl Ether 
  PARCHEM o-CGE
  Evonik Epoxy Diluents

Glycidyl ethers
Reactive diluents
Phenol ethers